Orly Silbersatz-Banai (born ) is an Israeli actress and singer. She has won two Ophir Awards and a prize from the Israeli Academy of Cinema and Television.

Early life
Orly Silbersatz was born in Israel, to a secular Jewish family of Ashkenazi Jewish descent.

Career
In 1978 she played the role of "Hohit" (חוחית) in the television program "Zehu Ze!", which soon became a cult phenomenon. In 1979 she played with Gidi Gov and Gali Atari in the movie Dizengoff 99. In 1988 she starred in Anat Gov's comedy series "So What?!" alongside Gidi Gov and Dov Navon. She has written several songs for "Mashina", of which her ex-husband Yuval Banai is a member.

In 1994 she played in Eytan Fox's movie "The Siren's Song" alongside Yair Lapid. The role earned her an Ophir Award. In 1996 she played in the film Saint Clara.

In 2000 she participated in the television series "Catching the Sky" (לתפוס את השמיים).

In 2002 she played alongside Maya Maron in the film Broken Wings. The film was submitted at film festivals in the United States and Germany (Berlin). The role earned her an Ophir Award.

In 2007 she participated in the television program "Mishmoret" and "Taking Out the Dog".

She played in the films "Lost Islands" (2008) and "Intimate Grammar" (2010).

She played an important supporting role of Aliza, the yeshiva secretary, in the first two seasons of the series "Shtisel" (2013-2016).

Personal life
Silbersatz and Israeli musician Yuval Banai married in 1987. They had three children. They divorced in 2007.

References

External links
 

Living people
1957 births
Orly
Israeli film actresses
Israeli television actresses
20th-century Israeli women singers